Zhu Lin (born 1949), born as Wang Zuling, is a Chinese novelist.

Life
Zhu Lin was the only child of parents who divorced when she was a baby. She did not have an easy childhood: she was brought up by her father, an academic, and a grandmother. Graduating from high school in 1968, she was rusticated to Fenyang County in Anhui Province, where she lived in primitive rural conditions. Blocked by her class background from attending university, she managed to return to Shanghai in 1975, working in a street factory before getting a job as an editor. She was editor at Shanghai Literature, until granted the status of professional writer in 1990. In 1980 she moved from Shanghai to Jiading in the suburbs, where she has continued to live.

Works

Novels
 The Path of Life (Shenghuo de lu), 1979.
 Tempering Tree (Kulian Shu), 1985
 The Sobbing Langcang River (Wuye de Langcang Jiang), 1990.

Short story collections
 Heart Blossoms (Xin hua), 1983.
 Hell and Paradise (Diyu yu tiantang), 1984
 Snake Pillow Flowers (She zhentou hua), 1984

Children's books
 Night Pearl (Ye mingzhu), 1982
 Morning Fog (Chenwu), 1984
 The Curved Stone Bridge (Wanwan de shi gongqiao), 1987

References

Further reading
 

1949 births
Living people
Chinese women novelists
20th-century Chinese women writers
21st-century Chinese women writers
Chinese women short story writers
Chinese children's writers
Chinese women children's writers
People's Republic of China novelists
20th-century Chinese short story writers
21st-century Chinese short story writers
People's Republic of China short story writers